Psychopathology is a peer-reviewed medical journal that research on and classification of mental illness in clinical psychiatry, the field of psychopathology. It was established in 1897 as Psychiatria Clinica and obtained its current name in 1984.

See also
 List of psychiatry journals

References

External links 
 

Psychiatry journals
Clinical psychology journals
Publications established in 1897
Karger academic journals
Bimonthly journals
English-language journals